Melnick 42 is a massive blue supergiant star in the Tarantula Nebula in the Large Magellanic Cloud located in the constellation Dorado. It is less than two parsecs from the centre of the R136 cluster, although that is well outside the central core.

Mk 42 was originally classified as spectral type WN when it was discovered, then as O3 If.  When the slash stars were defined it was given the spectral type O3 If*/WN6.  Finally, the introduction of the spectral class O2 and the refinement of slash star classifications led to it being tagged as O2 If*.  Although it is given a supergiant luminosity class, it is effectively a main sequence star still burning hydrogen in its core.  It is thought to be less than a million years old.

References

Stars in the Large Magellanic Cloud
Large Magellanic Cloud
Extragalactic stars
Tarantula Nebula
Dorado (constellation)
O-type supergiants
J05384212-6905552
Emission-line stars